Brian Taylor (born 29 June 1942) was an English professional footballer who played as a wing half.

Career
Born in Manchester, Taylor played for Rochdale and Altrincham.

References

1942 births
Date of death missing
English footballers
Rochdale A.F.C. players
Altrincham F.C. players
English Football League players
Association football wing halves